Steve Greenberg (born March 18, 1971) is a businessman, former professional hockey player, and was the Republican nominee for U.S. Congress in Illinois's 8th congressional district; he was defeated by incumbent Democrat Melissa Bean.

Greenberg is a former professional hockey player who played parts of two seasons for the Hampton Roads Admirals, a Washington Capitals affiliated minor league team.

After an injury ended his hockey career he took a job with his family's company, Promotions Unlimited, where he headed up the sales department.  While he was in charge of sales, Promotions Unlimited saw its greatest period of growth.  He is also the owner of Herr's Pacific, which distributes art supplies and craft materials.

Greenberg was recruited by the national Republicans to run against either Congresswoman Bean or Senator Dick Durbin.  He ultimately chose to run against Bean after determining that running for and serving in the Senate would put too great a strain on his family.    He was supported by the National Republican Congressional Committee and was one of the first beneficiaries of a special fund-raising program called "CHOMP" (Challengers Helping Obtain the Majority Program) fund-raising program.

Greenberg has served as a member of the Illinois Republican Party Finance Committee and as a Republican Precinct Committeeman.

External links

References

1971 births
American athlete-politicians
21st-century American businesspeople
American men's ice hockey left wingers
Hampton Roads Admirals players
Illinois Republicans
Living people
People from Long Grove, Illinois
Sault Ste. Marie Greyhounds players
Ice hockey players from Illinois